Marcelo Grohe (born 13 January 1987) is a Brazilian professional footballer who plays as a goalkeeper for Al-Ittihad Club of the Saudi Professional League.

Club career

Grêmio

Born in Campo Bom, Rio Grande do Sul, Grohe began his career at Grêmio, where he arrived in 2000 to serve on the under-13 team. Within five years, was he was promoted to the first team squad at 18, to be the third goalkeeper in the Campeonato Brasileiro Série B, however he did not play that season.

On 18 January 2006, he made his professional debut, playing 90 minutes in a 2–1 away win against São Luiz for the Campeonato Gaúcho.

On 25 October 2017, at a match against Barcelona of Guayaquil he made a save that is considered by some "the greatest save of all-time", even compared to Gordon Banks' save of the century at the 1970 World Cup; Banks himself praised the save.

Al-Ittihad
At the end of 2018, Grohe was sold for US$3 million to Al-Ittihad Club of Saudi Arabia. He signed a 3-year contract, but was initially sidelined by a wrist injury that required surgery.

On 8 November 2019, he made his season debut, in 4-0 win home against Al-Riyadh in  king cup

On 2 December 2020, Grohe saved an Éver Banega penalty to help send Al-Ittihad to Arab Club Champions Cup final. Grohe played 31 games in  2020-2021 season, finishing the season with 8 clean sheets and wins the goalkeeper of the month award 3 times.

International career
Grohe was a non-playing member of the Brazilian squad at the 2015 Copa América in Chile and at the 2014 Superclásico de las Américas in China PR. He made his debut on 5 September 2015 in a 1–0 friendly win over Costa Rica at the Red Bull Arena in New Jersey.

Career statistics

Honours

Grêmio
Campeonato Brasileiro Série B: 2005
Campeonato Gaúcho: 2006, 2007, 2010, 2018
Copa do Brasil: 2016
Copa Libertadores: 2017
Recopa Sudamericana: 2018

Al-Ittihad
Saudi Super Cup: 2022

Brazil
Superclásico de las Américas: 2014

Individual
Campeonato Brasileiro Série A most clean sheets: 2016
 Saudi Professional League Goalkeeper of the Month: August 2020, December 2020, April & May 2021, March 2022

References

External links

Marcelo Grohe at Goal.com (archived)

1987 births
Living people
Sportspeople from Rio Grande do Sul
Brazilian footballers
Brazilian expatriate footballers
Brazil international footballers
Campeonato Brasileiro Série A players
Grêmio Foot-Ball Porto Alegrense players
Association football goalkeepers
Brazilian people of German descent
Brazil youth international footballers
2015 Copa América players
Copa América Centenario players
Ittihad FC players
Saudi Professional League players
Expatriate footballers in Saudi Arabia
Brazilian expatriate sportspeople in Saudi Arabia